Street Fighter: Assassin's Fist is a British martial arts web series, TV series and feature film developed by Joey Ansah and Christian Howard. Based on Capcom's Street Fighter video game series, the story focuses on Ryu and Ken as they uncover the past of their master, Gouken and learn the secrets of their Dark Art, Ansatsuken.

The web series was released on Machinima's YouTube channel on 23 May 2014 while the subsequent formats (TV & DVD/Blu-ray) were released later the same year and IFC Films released the film on 7 January 2015.

A sequel series, Street Fighter: World Warrior, which would have seen Ryu and Ken come into conflict with M. Bison and Shadaloo, was in development, but was eventually scrapped in favour of Street Fighter: Resurrection, which served as a tie-in to Street Fighter V.

Cast
 Akira Koieyama as Gouken
 Shogen as Young Gouken
 Christian Howard as Ken Masters
 Mike Moh as Ryu
 Togo Igawa as Goutetsu / Goma
 Gaku Space as Gouki
 Joey Ansah as Older Gouki / Akuma
 Hyunri as Sayaka
 Mark Killeen as Mr. Masters
 Hal Yamanouchi as Senzo
 Yoshinori Ono as Fighting promoter

Production
The short film Street Fighter: Legacy, a passion project for Joey Ansah and Christian Howard, was released on YouTube in 2010 as a proof-of-concept. During San Diego Comic-Con International 2012 Capcom announced it had granted rights to the creators to go ahead with the project.

The series started a Kickstarter crowdsource funding campaign in order to source funds for production. The campaign was cancelled on 17 April 2013 when private backers stepped forward with the money necessary, removing the need for the crowdsource funds.

On 14 July 2013 production began filming in Simeonovo, Sofia, Bulgaria. On 24 August 2013 filming on the series wrapped.

On 20 August 2013, in an interview with Gamereactor, Ansah talked about Ryu and Ken's story and said "a good analogy with Ryu is that he's not actually ever competing with anyone else; he's competing with himself. Whereas Ken is driven fiercely by competition. A lot of Ken's conflict comes from his relationship with his father. Without giving too much away, we learn in this series how Ken came to be in Japan, in Gouken's dojo".

On 1 November 2013 Content has sold worldwide online rights for Street Fighter: Assassin's Fist to a major global online channel for a short first window. On 14 March 2014 Capcom and Machinima.com announced that the series would be airing on Machinima's main channel.

Home media
Funimation acquired the home video distribution rights and released the web series on DVD and Blu-ray under their Giant Ape label. Madman Entertainment and Manga Entertainment released the series in Australia and the UK, respectively.

Music
The music was composed by Patrick Gill with contributions from Ryan Ansah and Daniel Braine.

Episodes

Reception
In contrast to the poor reception of previous live-action Street Fighter films, Assassin's Fist has been acclaimed as the best and most faithful adaptation of the franchise. IGN gave the series a positive review, stating that it was more authentic to the franchise than either of the larger budgeted Street Fighter feature films, as well as one of the best live-action video-game adaptations overall, rating it an 8.7/10.

Shehzaan Abdulla from Continue-Play gave it a score of 8/10 and said, "Balancing in-jokes and fan service with humble, down-to-earth storytelling isn’t easy. Go too far in one direction and you end up with a hokey, pandering mess; go too far in the other, and you have a feature that feels disconnected, and uninspired by the source material. Assassin’s Fist walks this line almost perfectly."

References

External links
 
  (on Machinima.com's channel)
 
 Kickstarter Campaign for Street Fighter: Assassin's Fist
  (a short fan film)

Ansatsuken
Live-action films based on video games
Films shot in Bulgaria
Funimation
Martial arts films
Martial arts television series
Martial arts web series
Street Fighter films
Street Fighter television series
Works based on Street Fighter
Works by Joey Ansah
Live action television shows based on video games
Japan in non-Japanese culture